Nasri is a masculine given name and surname, commonly found in the Arabic language. People with this name include:

Given name
 Nasri (musician), Canadian singer-songwriter and producer
 Nasri (Saint Ignatius Elias III) (born 1867), 119th Patriarch of the Universal Syriac Orthodox Church
 Nasri Atallah (born 1982), Lebanese-British author, publisher and talent manager
 Nasri Cheppy (1950–2010), Indonesian film director
 Nasri Maalouf (1911–2005), Lebanese politician
 Nasri Shamseddine (1927–1983), Lebanese singer and act

Middle name
Makram Nasri Kaiser (1930–1996), Egyptian scientist, biologist, medical and veterinary acarologist, leading authority on ticks of the genus Hyalomma

Surname
 Ahmed Nasri, President of Fahd bin Sultan University
 Assala Nasri (born 1969), Syrian singer
 Maya Nasri (born 1976), Lebanese actress and singer
 Neophytos Nasri (1670–1731), bishop of Saidnaya of the Melkite Greek Catholic Church who took a pre-eminent part in the 1724 split of the Melkite Church
 Noura Nasri, Tunisian shooter and Olympian
 Samir Nasri (born 1987), French footballer
 Yousef El Nasri (born 1979), Spanish long-distance runner of Moroccan origin

See also
Nasri, Iran, village in Gafr and Parmon Rural District, Gafr and Parmon District, Bashagard County, Hormozgan Province, Iran
 Nasrid dynasty, the last Muslim dynasty in Spain
 Nisha Patel-Nasri (1977–2006), British business owner and special constable, murder victim
 Mohamed Ben Riadh Nasri, one of the Tunisian detainees at Guantanamo Bay
 Al-Nasr (disambiguation)
 Nasr (disambiguation)
 Nasser (disambiguation)

Arabic-language surnames
Arabic masculine given names
Turkish masculine given names